Flavio Cipolla and Potito Starace were the defending champions, but chose not to defend their title.

Fabrício Neis and Caio Zampieri won the title after defeating Kevin Krawietz and Dino Marcan 7–6(7–3), 4–6, [12–10] in the final.

Seeds

Draw

References
 Main Draw

XIV Venice Challenge Save Cup – Doubles
2016 Doubles